The Saharo-Arabian Region is a floristic region of the Holarctic Kingdom proposed by Armen Takhtajan. The region is covered by hot deserts, semideserts and savanna.

The region occupies the temperate parts of the Sahara desert, Sinai Peninsula, Arabian Peninsula (geographically defined), Southern Palestine and Lower Mesopotamia.

Flora
Much of its flora is shared with the neighboring Mediterranean and Irano-Turanian Regions of the Holarctic Kingdom and Sudano-Zambezian Region of the Paleotropical Kingdom. However, about a quarter of the species, especially in the families Asteraceae, Brassicaceae and Chenopodiaceae, are endemic.

Endemism

Some of the endemic genera are Nucularia, Fredolia, Agathophora, Muricaria, Nasturtiopsis, Zilla, Oudneya, Foleyola, Lonchophora, Gymnarrhena, Lifago. 

Floristic regions
Flora of North Africa
Desert flora
Sahara
Holarctic